Apteromyia is a genus of flies belonging to the family Lesser Dung flies.

Species
A. claviventris (Strobl, 1909)
A. newtoni Marshall & Roháček, 1982

References

Sphaeroceridae
Muscomorph flies of Europe
Diptera of North America
Sphaeroceroidea genera